If Footmen Tire You, What Will Horses Do? is a 1971 Christian film directed by Ron Ormond.

Background 
The film is based on a sermon by Estus W. Pirkle held on January 31, 1968 at Camp Zion in Myrtle with the title "If Footmen Tire You, What Will Horses Do?". The sermon was made available by print, and Estus W. Pirkle joined with filmmaker Ron Ormond in their first collaboration, and converted the sermon into a film. The pair made a number of other films, but this first film is the team's most well-known. The film became widely distributed among churches and church camps in the 1970s.

Summary
Based on the teachings of Estus Pirkle the film warns of the dangers facing the United States from Communist infiltrators. The film suggests that the only way to avoid such a fate is to turn to Christianity. It has attracted something of a cult following among secular fans because of its explicit depictions of torture and mass murder and the heavy-handed nature of its evangelical message. The title paraphrases :
If you have run with footmen and they have tired you out, Then how can you compete with horses? If you fall down in a land of peace, How will you do in the thicket of the Jordan?

In popular culture
The movie was sampled by the sound collage band Negativland. Pirkle's narrative includes an imagined visit to the United States under Communism where loudspeakers in internment camps issue proclamations such as "Christianity is stupid, Communism is good, give up!" ad infinitum. Negativland lifted the phrases and played them repeatedly backed by industrial music and various other sound effects into the song "Christianity Is Stupid". A more complete version of Pirkle's narrative can be heard on Negativland's Helter Stupid.

Availability 
The film was restored in 2018 and made available to stream for free on filmmaker Nicolas Winding Refn's proprietary service byNWR.

References

External links

1971 films
American anti-communist propaganda films
1970s dystopian films
Films about evangelicalism
Films directed by Ron Ormond
American dystopian films
Films about coups d'état
1970s rediscovered films
Rediscovered American films
1970s English-language films
1970s American films